Imperial College Business School is the graduate business school of Imperial College London. The business school was opened by Queen Elizabeth II.

History
In 1851, the Great Exhibition was the first World's Fair, organized by Prince Albert, husband of Queen Victoria. Prince Albert used the highly successful fair proceeds to build museums and colleges in South Kensington, to become a hub for science, culture, and industry.

In 1907, Imperial College was established by Royal Charter, which unified the Royal College of Science, Royal School of Mines, and City and Guilds of London Institute into one university.

In 1909, King Edward VII laid the foundation stone for the Royal School of Mines building, which is part of the present day Business School facilities. 

In 1955, Imperial's first MSc in Production Engineering and Management was launched at 14 Prince's Gate. In 1961, Imperial launches an MSc in Operational Research and Management Studies. In 1964, executive education short courses were launched in Operational Research.

In 1965, Imperial and the London School of Economics co-sponsor the founding of the London Business School. At the request of the UK Government, the Rector of Imperial College and Director of the London School of Economics became one of the seven members to guide the academic staff at the London Business School.

In 1971, a Department of Management Science was created. In 1978, the Department of Social & Economic Studies was formed.  In 1987, The Departments of Management Science and Department of Social & Economic Studies merged to form a Management School at 53 Prince's Gate.  

In 1989, an Executive MBA was launched.  In 2001, an Entrepreneurship Centre was established.  In 2002, a Distance Learning MBA was formed.  In 2003, an Innovation and Entrepreneurial group was established.

In 2003, Business is elevated to Faculty status at Imperial College London.

In 2004, Queen Elizabeth II opened Imperial College's Tanaka Business School.

In 2008, the business school drops the Tanaka name and becomes Imperial College Business School.

In 2021, Imperial's White City Campus was opened.

Campus 
The business school was likened after The Crystal Palace that housed the Great Exhibition in Hyde Park.  Designed by Lord Norman Foster, the building incorporates the Royal School of Mines Goldsmith's wing, including its 19th century vaults.

The school has additional facilities at Prince's Gate.  Some teaching and research will operate from Imperial's White City campus as well.

Programmes
The business school offers postgraduate education including an MBA, Masters, and Doctoral courses, as well as executive education.

Research Centres 
The business school has a number of centres from which research and consulting take place:
 Brevan Howard Centre for Financial Analysis
 Centre for Climate Finance & Investment
 Centre for Digital Transformation
 Centre for Financial Technology
 Centre for Health Economics & Policy Innovation
 Centre for Responsible Leadership
 Gandhi Centre for Inclusive Innovation
 Imperial Business Analytics
 Imperial Business Design Studio
 Leonardo Centre on Business for Society

Rankings 

University Overall

Over the last 10 years, Imperial has ranked in the top 5 universities in Europe within the Times Higher Education World University Rankings and QS World University Rankings.

 2023 Times Higher Education: 10th in the world, 3rd in Europe
 2023 QS: 6th in the world, 3rd in Europe
 2022 ARWU: 23rd in the world, 6th in Europe

Masters of Business Administration:

 2022 Financial Times: MBA - 9th in Europe
 2023 QS: MBA - 9th in Europe
 2023 QS: MBA by career specialization entrepreneurship - 1st in Europe.

Masters:

 2022 Financial Times: MSc Management - 2nd in the UK
 2023 QS: MSc Marketing - 1st in the UK
 2023 QS: MSc Management - 2nd in the UK

People

Directors and deans
 Sam Eilon (1955–1987)
 David Norbun (1987–2003)
 David Begg (2003–2012)
 Dorothy Griffiths (2012–2013)
 G. "Anand" Anandalingam (2013–June 2016)
 Nelson Phillips (July 2016–July 2017)
 Francisco Veloso (August 2017 – present)

Notable academic staff
 Franklin Allen, Associate Dean Research and Faculty, executive director of the Brevan Howard Centre (2014–present)
 Carol Propper, CBE, FBA, chair in Economics
 William Perraudin, economist (former Chair in Finance, now adjunct professor)
 David Miles, CBE, Professor of Financial Economics
 George Yip, Emeritus Professor of Marketing and Strategy
 Tommaso Valletti, chair in Economics, Chief Competition Economist of the European Commission (2016–2019)

References

External links
 Official site
 Imperial College Business School History and architecture of the school building

Business schools in England
Foster and Partners buildings
Educational institutions established in 2004
Business School
2004 establishments in England